Avenue 5 is a science fiction comedy television series created by Armando Iannucci that premiered on HBO in the United States on January 19, 2020. It stars Hugh Laurie and Josh Gad in lead roles as captain and owner of a fictional interplanetary cruise ship Avenue 5. The series was produced by HBO in the United States and Sky UK in the United Kingdom. In February 2020, just days before the COVID-19 pandemic led to worldwide lockdowns, the series was renewed for a second season; filming moved forward in late 2021, with a release date of October 10, 2022. In February 2023, the series was canceled after two seasons.

Premise 
Avenue 5 has been described as "set in the future, mostly in space." On board the interplanetary cruise ship, the Avenue 5, a momentary loss of artificial gravity and accidental death of its chief engineer sends the titular vessel 0.21 degrees off course. It's estimated it will take the ship three years to return to Earth, and with only enough supplies to sustain her many passengers for the intended eight-week long cruise, the crew of the Avenue 5 must struggle to maintain order and return the craft safely.

Cast and characters

Main 
 Hugh Laurie as Ryan Clark, the captain of Avenue 5
 Josh Gad as Herman Judd, billionaire owner of Avenue 5
 Zach Woods as Matt Spencer, Head of Customer Relations for Avenue 5
 Rebecca Front as Karen Kelly, a passenger aboard Avenue 5
 Suzy Nakamura as Iris Kimura, an associate owner of Avenue 5
 Lenora Crichlow as Billie McEvoy, second engineer on Avenue 5
 Nikki Amuka-Bird as Rav Mulcair, head of mission control for Avenue 5 back on Earth; later (episode 8 onward) is onboard Avenue 5
 Ethan Phillips as Spike Martin, a former astronaut and first (or fifth) Canadian on Mars, who is now a womanizing alcoholic on Avenue 5

Recurring 
 Himesh Patel as Jordan Hatwal, a stand-up comedian who takes up an eight-week residency on Avenue 5 (season 1)
 Jessica St. Clair as Mia, a passenger and Doug's wife
 Kyle Bornheimer as Doug, a passenger and Mia's husband
 Andy Buckley as Frank, a passenger and Karen's husband
 Matthew Beard as Alan Lewis, Rav's assistant on Earth
 Daisy May Cooper as Sarah (season 1), bridge crew; Zarah (season 2), Sarah's twin sister and an actress on Earth
 Adam Pålsson as Mads, bridge crew
 Julie Dray as Nadia, bridge crew
 Neil Casey as Cyrus, an engineer (season 1)
 Paterson Joseph as Harrison Ames, a rival of Judd's (season 1)
  Justin Edwards as Nathan Basic, the cannibal (season 2)
 Lucy Punch as Dawn Djopi, a talk-show host (season 2)
 Arsher Ali as Lucas Sato, a representative from the Office of the Other President (season 2)
 Leila Farzad as Elena, Clark's girlfriend and Charles' estranged wife (season 2)
 Jonathan Aris as Charles, Elena's estranged husband (season 2)

Episodes

Series overview

Season 1 (2020)

Season 2 (2022)

Production

Development 
On September 25, 2017, it was announced that HBO had given a pilot order to a new comedy series created by Armando Iannucci, who was also set to serve as writer and executive producer. In addition to the pilot order, the network also reportedly ordered backup scripts. In April 2019, a series pickup was commissioned by HBO for nine episodes. On February 13, 2020, the series was renewed for a second season, which would also consist of nine episodes. In October 2022, Iannucci told Entertainment Weekly that there are plans for a third season, saying that HBO was "very keen". On February 10, 2023, HBO canceled the series after two seasons.

Casting 
In August 2018, it was announced that Hugh Laurie and Suzy Nakamura had been cast in the pilot's lead roles as Captain Ryan Clark and Iris Kimura. On November 7, 2018, it was reported that Rebecca Front had joined the pilot's cast in another leading role as Karen Kelly. In February 2019, Zach Woods, Josh Gad, Nikki Amuka-Bird and Lenora Crichlow were cast as series regulars Matt Spencer, Herman Judd, Rav Mulclair, and Billie McEvoy. Himesh Patel was added in June as comedian on the ship Jordan Hatwal. The main cast members were returned for the second season by the time of its announcement.

Writing 
By July 2021, the first six episodes of the second season were plotted out, leaving only the final three to be outlined "next month". Iannucci added, "It's basically about people in isolation. So, we're just waiting to see what the mood might be as to how we pitch. Is it going to be bleak despair, or is it going to be very, very silly? Or maybe silly despair? I don't know. We tried to make season one as silly as possible, but it seems to have strangely become a kind of documentary about present-day conditions."

Filming 
Principal photography for the pilot took place in 2018 in London, England. While filming was taking place at Warner Bros. Studios, Leavesden in July 2019, a fire damaged one of the show's sets. Production for the second season was halted due to the COVID-19 pandemic. In August 2021, creator Armando Iannucci confirmed on Twitter that season two would begin filming, "in a matter of days." A post by Josh Gad confirmed the start of filming in August. Another post by Gad also confirmed the end of filming in late November 2021.

Release 
The series premiered on January 19, 2020, on HBO. In New Zealand, the series is distributed by Sky satellite television provider's SOHO2 channel and Neon streaming service. The second season premiered on October 10, 2022, on HBO.

Reception

Critical response 
On Rotten Tomatoes, the first season has an approval rating of 67% based on 52 reviews, with an average rating of 6.3/10. The website's critical consensus states, "If Avenue 5 maiden voyage isn't as smooth as its creative clout implies, it's still a hilarious step in a completely new—while still enjoyably caustic—direction for creator Armando Iannucci." On Metacritic, it has a weighted average score of 64 out of 100, based on 28 critics, indicating "generally favorable reviews".

Ratings

Notes

References

External links 
 
 

2020 American television series debuts
2022 American television series endings
2020s American comic science fiction television series
HBO original programming
Space adventure television series
Television series created by Armando Iannucci
Television series set in the future
Television shows shot in London
Television shows filmed in England
Fiction about the Solar System